The 2000 Berlin Thunder season was the second season for the franchise in the NFL Europe League (NFLEL). The team was led by head coach Peter Vaas in his first year, and played its home games at Jahn-Sportpark in Berlin, Germany. They finished the regular season in sixth place with a record of four wins and six losses.

Offseason

Free agent draft

Personnel

Staff

Roster

Schedule

Standings

Notes

References

Berlin
Berlin Thunder seasons